Sibak: Midnight Dancers is a 1994 Philippines film, and the first of a series of three gay-themed movies by Mel Chionglo and Ricky Lee about the lives of macho dancers (strippers) in the gay bars of Manila. The later two are Burlesk King and Twilight Dancers. All three follow in the tradition of Lino Brocka's 1988 film Macho Dancer. This movie was banned in the Philippines.

Plot
The story revolves around the lives of three brothers who work as strippers in a gay bar in Ermita, Manila. The oldest, Joel, has a wife and a boyfriend. Dennis, the middle brother, steals car radios with his friends. The youngest, Sonny, dropped out of college and has a transsexual lover.

Cast

Reception
The film received positive reviews from the Toronto Film Festival. However, the film was banned by the Movie and Television Review and Classification Board.

References

External links

1994 films
Philippine LGBT-related films
Tagalog-language films
LGBT-related drama films
1994 LGBT-related films
1994 drama films
Philippine drama films
Films directed by Mel Chionglo